"Sins of the Father" is the 65th episode of the American science fiction television series Star Trek: The Next Generation and the 17th episode of the third season.

Set in the 24th century, the series follows the adventures of the Starfleet crew of the Federation starship Enterprise-D. In this episode, the Enterprise's Klingon Chief of Security, Lt. Worf, challenges the Klingon High Council's accusation that his father was a traitor.

This is the first of four appearances of Worf's brother Kurn, each played by actor Tony Todd, in the Star Trek franchise; Kurn last appears on the series Star Trek: Deep Space Nine in the episode "Sons of Mogh" (broadcast February 12, 1996).

Plot
As part of the Federation-Klingon officer exchange program, Klingon Commander Kurn asks to serve aboard the Enterprise as first officer. His Klingon command style aggravates the crew. Lieutenant Worf confronts Kurn, where Kurn reveals he is Worf's younger brother; when Worf's family went to Khitomer, Kurn was left with Lorgh, a friend of their father Mogh. Kurn was raised as Lorgh's son. Mogh is being charged posthumously as a traitor by Duras, the son of Mogh's rival, in the Khitomer massacre, which will mar the family name for seven generations. Worf requests a leave of absence to defend his father's honor. Captain Picard believes Worf's actions as a Starfleet officer in his father's defense will be of significant interest to the Federation and directs the Enterprise to Qo'noS to monitor events. Kurn volunteers to be Worf's Cha'DIch, a second to stand with Worf. Worf agrees, but warns Kurn not to reveal his bloodline.

At the High Council, Duras reveals evidence of Mogh sending Khitomer's defense codes to the Romulans. Worf is urged privately by the aging K'mpec, the Klingon Chancellor, to drop the challenge. Worf discusses this request with Picard, who orders his crew to examine the evidence. Duras ambushes Kurn, aware of his bloodline, and attempts to get him to betray Worf. Kurn is wounded in the ensuing fight, no longer able to support Worf. Picard takes Kurn's place.

The Enterprise crew discovers that the Khitomer logs were modified and find another survivor of the massacre, Worf's nurse Kahlest. Picard convinces Kahlest, who knows Mogh was loyal to the Klingon Empire, to help. Picard brings Kahlest to testify, bluffing that she knows who the true traitor was. K'mpec calls Worf, Picard, Duras, and Kahlest into his quarters and reveals the truth: the Council knows that Duras's father was the Khitomer traitor, but exposing this, given Duras's political position and capital, would lead to civil war. The Council accepted Duras's charge of treason believing Worf would not challenge it. K'mpec imparts that the Council will condemn Worf and Kurn, but Picard refuses to let this injustice stand, creating a situation that could end the Klingon-Federation alliance. In the end, Worf accepts a discommendation, tantamount to admitting his father's guilt; in exchange, the knowledge of the proceedings, including Kurn's true-bloodedness, will be undisclosed. In the council, all of the assembled Klingons, including a reluctant Kurn, turn their backs on Worf in disgrace, and he and Picard leave the hall.

Production 

This episode has the Klingon Great Hall designed by Richard James; the Great Hall and others sets won an Emmy for Best Art Design for this episode. The Great Hall is where the Klingon High Council meets in the Star Trek science fiction universe.

The view of the Great Hall exterior view was done by a matte painting.

Reception

This episode won an Emmy award for Best Art Design.

Zack Handlen of The A.V. Club gave the episode a B+ grade.
Keith DeCandido of Tor.com rated the episode 8 out of 10.

The episode ranked seventh in Entertainment Weeklys list of top 10 Star Trek: The Next Generation episodes. In 2017, Den of Geek included "Sins of the Father" as one of their 25 recommended episodes of Star Trek: The Next Generation. In 2017, The Daily Dot recommended this as a Star Trek Klingon alien themed episode to prepare for Star Trek: Discovery.

In 2017, Nerdist ranked "Sins of the Father" the ninth best episode of Star Trek: The Next Generation.

In 2019, Screen Rant ranked "Sins of the Father" the second best episode of Star Trek: The Next Generation. In 2020, ScreenRant again ranked it the second best episode, noting it explores the fictional alien Klingon culture, Worf (played by Michael Dorn), and explores the concept of honor and alien politics.

In 2021, Cinemablend ranked this one of the top ten episodes of TNG. They note this episode helps establish background on Klingon aliens, and its plot is harnessed by later episodes.

Releases
The episode was released with Star Trek: The Next Generation season three DVD box set, released in the United States on July 2, 2002. This had 26 episodes of Season 3 on seven discs, with a Dolby Digital 5.1 audio track. It was released in high-definition Blu-ray in the United States on April 30, 2013.

The episode is one of three chosen for Paramount's "The Next Level" Blu-ray sampler. During the high definition (HD) remastering process a 13-second portion of the episode had to be upconverted from a standard definition source as the original 35 mm elements could not be located. This footage was later located and remastered in HD for the third season Blu-ray set.

See also
 Sins of the Father (disambiguation) (Bible quote)

References

External links
 

Star Trek: The Next Generation (season 3) episodes
1990 American television episodes
Emmy Award-winning episodes
Television episodes written by Ronald D. Moore
Television episodes directed by Les Landau